José Gastón Pavlovich Rodríguez (born June 19, 1968) is a Mexican film producer. He is the founder of Fábrica de Cine.

Filmography

Films

 El estudiante (2009) — producer
 Max Rose (film) (2013) — producer
 A Hologram for the King (2016) — executive producer
 Silence (2016) — producer
 The Professor and the Madman (2017) — producer
 Sun Dogs (2017) — producer
 108 Costuras (2018) — producer
 The Irishman (2019) — producer

References

External links
 

Living people
1968 births
Mexican film producers
People from Agua Prieta
Mexican people of Montenegrin descent